Frederick Carmen Young (11 June 1896 – 9 October 1968) was a merchant and political figure in New Brunswick, Canada. He represented Gloucester County in the Legislative Assembly of New Brunswick from 1944 to 1960 as a Liberal member.

He was born in Caraquet, New Brunswick, the son of Frederick T. B. Young and Helen Carman. He was educated at the University of New Brunswick. In 1924, Young married Janet McLean. He was a wholesale dealer in fish. Young served overseas during World War I. In 1917, he transferred to the Royal Flying Corps. Frederick and Janet had 10 Children, Nellie, Walter, Robert, Margaret, Harold, Muriel, Frederick, Elizabeth, Marjorie, and Joan. He died in 1968 following a long illness.

References 

 Canadian Parliamentary Guide, 1956, PG Normandin

1896 births
1968 deaths
University of New Brunswick alumni
Canadian military personnel of World War I
Royal Flying Corps officers
Businesspeople from New Brunswick
New Brunswick Liberal Association MLAs
People from Caraquet